Jessica Monet Barton, also known as Jesse Barton, is a model and an actress who was born on May 28, 1983, in Adairsville, Georgia.She grew up to become a tomboy.

Import racing 
Along with being a model and actress, Jessica also races import cars. She is known for her 1994 street legal Toyota Supra that pulled 1,165 whp, beating Nissan Skylines and Lamborghinis, on the dyno during the TX2K12 event at Lonestar Motorsports Park. This same car also scored her an 8.64 at 170.88 miles per hour in a quarter mile during the 16th Annual U.S. Army World Cup Finals at Maryland International Raceway in 2011.

Stolen car 

In January 2013, after 8 years of ownership, Jessica's Toyota Supra was stolen and stripped for parts. Police found a large number of other stolen goods in the house it was recovered from, including license plates, motorcycle and car parts, some of Jessica's belongings, some of her former boyfriend Darin's belongings that were stolen with the car, and even a fully assembled motorcycle.

Filmography

Film

References

See also 
 

1983 births
Living people
American actresses
Female models from Georgia (U.S. state)
American female racing drivers
21st-century American women